No Place to Fall is the fifth album by pioneer Country rock musician Steve Young. It has a more Outlaw Country sound than his earlier work.

Track listing
All tracks composed by Steve Young; except where indicated
"No Place to Fall"  (Townes Van Zandt)
"Montgomery in the Rain"  
"Dreamer"  
"Always Loving You"  
"Drift Away"  (Mentor Williams)
"Seven Bridges Road" 
"I Closed My Heart's Door"  (Ralph Jones, Stoney Cooper)
"Don't Think Twice, It's All Right"  (Bob Dylan)
"I Can't Sleep"  (Steve Goodman)
"I Got the Same Old Blues"  (J. J. Cale)

Personnel
Steve Young - guitar, vocals
Buddy Spicher - violin
Buddy Emmons - steel guitar
Lloyd Green - steel guitar
Jerry Shook - guitar, harmonica
Joseph Allen - bass
Mike Leech - bass
Charles Cochran - keyboards
Kristin Wilkinson - viola
Larry Byrom - guitar
Jimmy Colvard - guitar
David Kirby - guitar
Dale Sellers - guitar
Charlie McCoy - harmonica
Mac Gayden - guitar
Karl Himmel - drums
Kenny Malone - drums
Tracy Nelson - vocals
Kim Young - vocals

References

Steve Young (musician) albums
1978 albums
RCA Records albums